The 1988 Macau Grand Prix Formula Three was the 35th Macau Grand Prix race to be held on the streets of Macau on 27 November 1988. It was the fifth edition for Formula Three cars.

Entry list

Race

References

F2 Register

External links
 The official website of the Macau Grand Prix

Macau Grand Prix
Grand
Macau